Jerome Singer may refer to:

 Jerome E. Singer (1934–2010), American psychologist
 Jerome L. Singer (1924–2019), American clinical psychologist